Graah may refer to:
Wilhelm August Graah, Danish Arctic explorer
Lille Graah, Norwegian journalist
Knud Graah, Danish born Norwegian industrialist
Graahs Bomuldsspinderi, a textile manufacturing company in Norway
Graah Fjord, a fjord in Greenland
Graah Mountains (Graah Fjelde), a mountain range in Greenland